Moroccan Futsal Championship is the premier futsal league in Morocco. The competition is run by the Championnat National du Futsal D1 under the auspices of the Royal Moroccan Football Federation.

Teams
 ACDK : Club Dynamo Kenitra
 AFSS : Association Feth Sportif Settat
 ASFA : Association Sportive Faucon Agadir
 AVHK : Association Ville Haute Kenitra
 AZYO : Association Zarkae el Yamama Oujda
 CAFK : Club Ajax Futsal Kenitra
 CJK : Club Jeunesse Khouribga
 CNM : Club Nejm Mdagh Berkane
 CSAT : Club Sportif Ajax Tanger
 FCAAT : Futsal Club Association Ajax Tetouan
 KACS : Kenitra Athletic Club Sebou
 RCA : Raja Club Athlétic

List of champions

 2009–10: CJK
 2010–11: CJK
 2011–12: CJK
 2012–13: CJK
 2013–14:
 2014–15:
 2015–16: ACDK
 2016–17: CFSS
 2017–18: AFSS
 2018–19: CFSS

See also
Moroccan Futsal Cup

References

External links
Official website

 

Futsal competitions in Morocco
futsal
2009 establishments in Morocco
Morocco
Sports leagues established in 2009